Mihail, câine de circ is a 1979 Romanian adventure film directed by Sergiu Nicolaescu. It is based on the novel Michael, Brother of Jerry.

Cast
 Karl Michael Vogler – Dag Daughtry
 Ernest Maftei – Greenleaf
 Sergiu Nicolaescu – Harley Kennan
 Ilarion Ciobanu – Kapitän Duncan
 Amza Pellea – Dr. Emory
 Ion Besoiu – Harry Del Mar
 Vincent Osborne – negrul Kwaque
 Hans W. Hamacher – Kapitän Doane
 Ileana Popovici – Villa Kennan
 Anthony Chinn – Ah Moy
 Cornel Gîrbea – Grimshaw
 Colea Răutu – Nishikanta
 Mircea Albulescu – dr. Edmond Masters
 Dina Mihalcea – doamna Collins
 Valeria Gagialov – Mary, soția dr. Emory (as Valeria Gagealov)
 Ștefan Mihăilescu-Brăila – recrutorul de matrozi
 Ion Anestin
 Constantin Băltărețu – chelner
 Vladimir Găitan – Cop
 Doru Năstase
 Alexandru Dobrescu – pasager
 Mircea Crețu
 Gheorghe Visu – valet
 Dinu Gherasim
 Ion Andrei
 Nicolae Dide
 Păstorel Ionescu – dansator
 Vasile Popa
 Titus Gurgulescu
 Ovidiu Georgescu

References

External links 
 
 Mihail, caine de circ (1979) at Cinemagia

1979 films
1970s adventure films
Romanian drama films
West German films
1970s Romanian-language films
Films based on works by Jack London
Films directed by Sergiu Nicolaescu
Films about dogs
German adventure drama films
1970s German films